The Train: Escape to Normandy is a video game released by Accolade in 1987 and themed loosely on the motion picture The Train, starring Burt Lancaster.  In the video game, the player assumes the role of a train hijacker who has commandeered a steam train to escape Nazi Germany during World War II. When the train is in motion the player must maintain the correct speed, steam pressure and other operational parameters of the train; also, the player must attempt to shoot down Nazi fighter planes which occasionally strafe the train by aiming and firing anti-aircraft guns mounted to the engine of the train. When the train occasionally stops briefly for resupply at various train stations, the player also must provide cover fire against attackers in the station buildings for comrades resupplying the train.

The Train was initially released for several 8-bit computer platforms, including the Commodore 64. The game was also later released on IBM PC.

Reception
Computer Gaming World called The Train "a rousing action game". It criticized the graphics' quality as below Accolade's standards, but said that the train-engineering portions were excellent. A survey of strategy and war games gave it two stars out of five.

The Spanish magazine Microhobby valued the game with the following scores: Originality: 70% Graphics: 70% Motion: 70% Sound: 60% Difficulty: 80% Addiction: 90%

References

External links
 

1987 video games
Accolade (company) games
Amstrad CPC games
Commodore 64 games
DOS games
Video games about Nazi Germany
Video games developed in Canada
ZX Spectrum games
World War II video games
Artech Studios games
Single-player video games